Chickamauga Creek refers to two short tributaries of the Tennessee River, which join the river near Chattanooga, Tennessee. The two streams are North Chickamauga Creek and South Chickamauga Creek, joining the Tennessee from the north and south side, respectively. There is also a West Chickamauga Creek, which is a much longer tributary of the South Chickamauga Creek.

Course
The two Chickamauga Creeks are part of the Georgia, Middle Tennessee-Chickamauga Watershed.

North Chickamauga Creek begins in an area called The Horseshoe, a portion of Walden Ridge, a branch of the Cumberland Plateau. The creek forms in southeastern Sequatchie County at the confluence of Standifer and Brimer creeks north of the community of Lone Oak, and runs entirely in Tennessee. South Chickamauga Creek is a long and winding valley-floor stream in the northwest corner of Georgia. It flows north from Ringgold, Georgia, over the border into Tennessee and from there into the city of Chattanooga.

A major tributary of the South Chickamauga Creek is West Chickamauga Creek, which rises out of the confluence of Mud Creek and Mill Creek, and is joined by Brotherton Creek, just northeast of the Zahnd Wildlife Management Area between Rising Fawn and Lafayette in Walker County, Georgia. (Note: One EPA Watershed Report shows the West Chickamauga as rising out of the south end of Lookout Mountain, near Sandy Hollow. However, the same map labels that part of the creek as "Hog Jowl Creek", although the pop-up active link shows the Creek as "West Chickamauga Creek" 
The West Chickamauga flows northeast through Walker and Catoosa counties in Northwest Georgia, and forms the southeast border of the Chickamauga National Military Park in Chickamauga, Fort Oglethorpe and Ringgold, Georgia. It winds northeast to join the South Chickamauga Creek near Brown Acres Golf Course in eastern Hamilton County, Tennessee, just north of the Tennessee/Georgia border.
West Chickamauga Creek can be navigated by kayak or canoe from near Gordon and Lee Mill (Chickamauga, GA) northeast, to where it joins with the South Chickamauga Creek, and from there northward to the Tennessee River at Chattanooga, Tennessee.

History

Chickamauga Indians

The tribal band of the Cherokee which settled near the creeks in the late 18th century became known as the Chickamauga. Under the leadership of Dragging Canoe, they became a frontier adversary to early American expansionism west of the Appalachian Mountains.

"Chickamauga" meaning

There is much discussion about the meaning of "Chickamauga". Although some experts say it translates to "River of Death", that name has no reference to the Battle of Chickamauga itself. It could also come from an ancient Chickasaw autonym- "Chickemacaw" as James Adair spelled it in his book The History of the American Indians.

Battle of Chickamauga

During the Civil War, one of the bloodiest engagements of the war was fought near West Chickamauga Creek over control of the railroad center at nearby Chattanooga. The conflict became known as the Battle of Chickamauga, fought September 18–20, 1863. However, the creek itself had very little influence on the course of the battle. The first skirmishes of the battle were fought when Confederate troops attempted to cross the West Chickamauga Creek, especially at Alexander's Bridge and Reed's Bridge, near the southeast and northeast borders of the present-day Chickamauga National Military Park

Confederate General Braxton Bragg had collected reinforcements and prepared to do battle, assisted by General James Longstreet. After three days of fighting, Rosecrans and a large portion of his army fled the field in disarray. The Battle of Chickamauga marked the end of the Union's "Chickamauga Campaign" in southeastern Tennessee and northwestern Georgia, and cost Rosencrans his command.

See also
List of rivers of Tennessee

Notes

Rivers of Tennessee
Rivers of Georgia (U.S. state)
Creek
Geography of Chattanooga, Tennessee
Bodies of water of Hamilton County, Tennessee